Savita Kapoor is an Indian politician and the MLA from Dehradun Cantonment Assembly. She is a member of the Bharatiya Janata Party.

References 

Living people
People from Dehradun district
Uttarakhand MLAs 2022–2027
Bharatiya Janata Party politicians from Uttarakhand
Year of birth missing (living people)